Portuguese Oman refers to the period during which the territory was under Portuguese rule, between 1507 and 1656. 

The region was conquered by Portuguese forces under the command of Afonso de Albuquerque in 1507, and remained under Portuguese control until they were expelled by the Ya'rubids.

History 1507–1656

In the early 16th century, Oman was a province of the Kingdom of Hormuz, ruled by its governors.

In 1507, the Portuguese captain-major of the seas of Arabia Afonso de Albuquerque conquered the coastal cities of Oman with a six ship squadron and about 500 men, imposing the payment of a tribute in exchange for autonomous rule. In 1515, as Governor of India Albuquerque captured the city of Hormuz itself, by the entrance of the Persian Gulf, and erected on it the Fort of Our Lady of the Conception. Hormuz and its provinces were thus reduced to a Portuguese protectorate, and since then, Portuguese merchants and military garrisons were established on Oman, most importantly Muscat, due to its sheltered deep-water harbour. 

In 1523, Sohar rebelled, but it was pacified by Dom Luís de Menezes, while Muscat and Qalhat rebelled in 1526 but were likewise pacified.

Muscat was raided by Ottoman fleets in 1546, 1551, and again in 1581. The Portuguese fortified the city in their aftermath, concluding the forts Almirante (Al-Mirani) and São João (Jalali) in 1588. A fort was erected at Khor Fakkan in 1621.

In 1622, Hormuz was captured by Safavid Persia with the aid of the English East India Company. The Kingdom of Hormuz was dissolved and the Portuguese relocated their forces to Oman, which was placed under the direct rule of a Portuguese captain-general, seated in Muscat. From Oman the Portuguese not only developed the trade in the region but conducted attacks on the Persian coast and English or Dutch navigation in the Gulf. 

Julfar was captured by the Yarubids in 1633. Sohar followed in 1643. Muscat was besieged by the Yarubids in 1648, and peace treaty negotiated with the Portuguese, but the city was again attacked two years later and fell. In 1656 the Portuguese evacuated Khasab, thus putting an end to Portuguese rule in the region.

Portuguese fortresses in Oman

Along the Omani coast the Portugueese erected forts and installed garrisons to defend the territory from incursions from pirates, the Persians and local Arab tribes from the interior.

Mascate – Muscat – headquarters of the Portuguese captain-general of the sea of Hormuz responsible for all Portuguese operations in Oman, the Persian Gulf and Red Sea.
Borca – Barka
Calaiate – Qalhat
Cassapo – Khasab 
Curiate – Qurayyat  
Doba – Dibba 
Dubo – Dubbo
Julfar – Julfar
Libedia – Al Badiyah 
Lima – Limah
Madá – Madha
Matara – Muttrah 
Mocombira – Mocombi
Orfação – Khor Fakkan 
Sibo – Seeb
Soar – Sohar
Quelba – Kalba

Gallery

See also
 Battle of the Gulf of Oman

References 

History of Oman
Former Portuguese colonies